The Carnegie Library in Lawton, Oklahoma is a Carnegie library building from 1922. It was listed on the National Register of Historic Places in 1976.

It is built of buff-tan brick with white limestone used for window trim and other ornamentation.

It was originally a  square plan building, but a 1952 extension added  to the north side.

References

Library buildings completed in 1922
Libraries on the National Register of Historic Places in Oklahoma
Neoclassical architecture in Oklahoma
Buildings and structures in Comanche County, Oklahoma
Carnegie libraries in Oklahoma
National Register of Historic Places in Comanche County, Oklahoma
1922 establishments in Oklahoma